Pseudomonas excibis is a gram-negative, rod bacterium first isolated from the gastric caeca of the cactus bug (Chelinidea vittiger). The type strain is ATCC 12293.

References

Pseudomonadales